Pondi may be,

Pondi language
Paul Pondi
Julius Gbabojor Pondi